The nai (archaic: muscal) is a Romanian diatonic pan flute used since the 17th century in a lot of genres.

Structure

The nai has usually at least 20 pipes made of bamboo or reed. They are arranged in a curved array, allowing a greater speed of play. Generally the longer, lower pipes are on the right.  The pitch of each pipe is adjusted with beeswax; usually nais are tuned in G for Romanian folk music, or in C for classical.  Traditional Romanian pan flutes have tubes with varying diameters which go from wide to narrow as you go up the scale, to maintain the volume/length ratio of the tube and therefore produce the best consistent tone quality.

Famous nai players
Damian Drăghici
Gheorghe Zamfir
Dana Dragomir
Fănică Luca
Constantin Moscovici
Madalin Luca

References

External links 

The "Romanian" Nai?
panflute.ca Kevin Budd's Pan Flute pages
June Chikuma / Pastorale Records

Panpipes
Romanian musical instruments